is a passenger railway station in the city of Kashiwa, Chiba, Japan, operated by the private railway operator Tōbu Railway. The station is numbered "TD-26".

Lines

Station layout
The station consists of two opposed side platforms serving two tracks, with an elevated station house.

Platforms

History 
Masuo Station was opened on 27 December 1923. From 17 March 2012, station numbering was introduced on all Tobu lines, with Masuo Station becoming "TD-26".

Passenger statistics
In fiscal 2019, the station was used by an average of 13,089 passengers daily.>

Surrounding area
Masuo Post Office
Hirohata Hachiman-gu

References

External links

 Tōbu Railway Station information

Railway stations in Japan opened in 1923
Railway stations in Chiba Prefecture
Tobu Noda Line
Stations of Tobu Railway
Kashiwa